Lecithocera deloma is a moth in the family Lecithoceridae. It was described by John Hartley Durrant in 1915. It is found on New Guinea.

The wingspan is about 15 mm. The forewings are leaden grey with a narrow whitish ochreous costal stripe from the base to the apex. The hindwings are cinereous (ash grey).

References

Moths described in 1915
deloma